Dianthus glacialis, the glacier pink or ice pink, is a species of pink native to the eastern Alps and the Carpathians. A dwarf species, it reaches at most 10cm, and prefers to grow on granite.

References

glacialis
Plants described in 1789